Richard Grant Perry (born 26 May 1953) is a former New Zealand rugby union player. He was educated at St. Andrew's College. He initially began his rugby union career as a loose forward but switched to hooker, Perry represented Mid Canterbury at a provincial level where he captained the team from 1977. He was called into the New Zealand national side, the All Blacks, as a replacement on the 1980 tour of Fiji. He played a single match, against Nadroga at Lautoka.

His brother, Bruce, represented Mid Canterbury between 1976 and 1977. His son Tim Perry made his All Blacks debut against the Barbarians on 4 November in a 31–22 win and became All Black #1162, becoming the 20th All Black whose father played for the team.

References

1953 births
Living people
Rugby union players from Christchurch
New Zealand rugby union players
New Zealand international rugby union players
Mid Canterbury rugby union players
Rugby union hookers